Martha is an unincorporated community in Wilson County, Tennessee. It is located along State Route 109 and U.S. Route 70.  The community has a handful of businesses and a stop on the Music City Star commuter rail service.

Some of Martha has been annexed by the city of Lebanon.

References

Unincorporated communities in Wilson County, Tennessee
Unincorporated communities in Tennessee